Gábor Balogh (born 5 August 1976 in Budapest, Hungary) is a former Hungarian modern pentathlete who won a silver medal at the 2000 Summer Olympics in Sydney, Australia.

He was elected Hungarian Sportsman of the Year in 1999 and 2001 for winning gold medals at the World and European Championships.

References

External links
 

1976 births
Living people
Hungarian male modern pentathletes
Olympic modern pentathletes of Hungary
Modern pentathletes at the 2000 Summer Olympics
Modern pentathletes at the 2004 Summer Olympics
Modern pentathletes at the 2008 Summer Olympics
Olympic silver medalists for Hungary
Olympic medalists in modern pentathlon
Sportspeople from Budapest
Medalists at the 2000 Summer Olympics